Qatar observes several public holidays. The two weekend days are Friday and Saturday. Annual public holidays include:

Several holidays are celebrated by the government or banks as well.

External links 
Information on public holidays from Qatar Ministry of Interior

References 

 
Qatar